Balta Albă is a commune in Buzău County, Muntenia, Romania. It is composed of four villages: Amara, Balta Albă, Băile and Stăvărăști.

Notes

Communes in Buzău County
Localities in Muntenia